Belgard is a stop on the Luas light-rail tram system in Dublin, Ireland.  It opened in 2004 as a stop on the Red Line.  The stop is located on a section of reserved track at the side of Katherine Tynan Road in south-west Dublin, near the Belgard Heights housing estate.

In 2011, a new branch of the red line to Saggart was opened.  Belgard then became the last stop on the common section of the line and was extensively rebuilt in order to serve its new purpose as an interchange, with an impressive canopy covering the new structure.  The stop now has four platforms - two island platforms facing three tracks.

Ordinarily, the two outer platforms are used as a conventional through stop: the platform closest to the road is for northbound trams en route to Connolly or The Point, and the farthest platform is for trams travelling the other way, which then depart and travel another 400m away from the stop before going through a junction which separates the branches to Tallaght and Saggart.

In the early mornings, evenings, and on weekends, Red Line trams from the city centre all go to Tallaght.  At these times, the Saggart branch is served by a shuttle service which terminates at the middle track at Belgard.  Passengers wishing to travel between Saggart and the city centre at these times must change at Belgard.

The stop is also served by Go-Ahead Ireland routes 76 and 76A.

References

Luas Red Line stops in South Dublin (county)